Krook is a surname. Notable people with this surname include:

 Ab Krook (1944–2020), Dutch speed skater
 Augusta Krook (1853—1941), Finnish teacher and politician
 Caroline Krook (born 1944), bishop in the Church of Sweden
 Christina Krook (1742–1806), Finnish educator
 Dorothea Krook-Gilead (1920-1989), Israeli literary scholar, translator, and professor of English literature
 Karl Krook (1887–1966), Swedish tug of war competitor
 Kevin Krook (born 1958), Canadian ice hockey player
 Margaretha Krook (1925–2001), Swedish actress
 Matt Krook (born 1994), American baseball player
 Max Krook (1913–1985), American mathematician and astrophysicist
 Stefan Krook (born 1950), Swedish sailor

See also 
 Kr00k, a computer security vulnerability